Primula tanneri is a species of flowering plant in the family Primulaceae.

Description
The base itself is cordate and subsagittate with irregular margins, coarse dentate and acute apex. P. tanneri have an emarginated and lanceolated lobes which are obovate to oblong with a light to deep purple coloured corolla which can also be blue or white. Flowers are heterostyly with stamens toward the apex and bloom in May.

Distribution and habitat 

Subspecies and varieties 
Subspecies and varieties of P. tanneri include:

 Primula tanneri subsp. nepalensis
 Primula tanneri subsp. tsariensis
 Primula tanneri var. porrecta

References

tanneri
Flora of East Himalaya
Flora of Nepal
Flora of Tibet
Plants described in 1886